Tayeb Braikia (born 8 March 1974 in Århus) is a Danish former cyclist.

Major results

1996
1st  U23 National Road Race Championships
1997
1st Stages 1 & 5 Cinturón a Mallorca
2nd Midtbank Grand Prix
3rd Overall Tour de Berlin
1998
1st Ronde van Overijssel
1999
1st Overall Circuit Franco-Belge
1st Stages 1 & 4
2001
1st Clásica de Almería

References

1974 births
Living people
Danish male cyclists
Sportspeople from Aarhus